The 1985 Victorian state election, held on Saturday, 2 March 1985, was for the 50th Parliament of Victoria. It was held in the Australian state of Victoria to elect all 88 members of the state's Legislative Assembly and 22 members of the 44-member Legislative Council. Since the previous election, the number of members of the Legislative Assembly was increased by 7 to 88.

Lindsay Thompson, who led the Liberal Party to a defeat at the 1982 election with a 17-seat swing against it, resigned the leadership of the party on 5 November 1982. He was succeeded by Jeff Kennett. At the election, the incumbent Labor Party government led by John Cain Jr. maintained its electoral support, though the Liberal Party did increase the number of seats. It was the first time since Federation that a Labor government had been reelected in Victoria.

Results

Legislative Assembly

|}

Legislative Council

|}

Seats changing hands

Members listed in italics did not recontest their seats.
In addition, the National party retained the seat of Swan Hill, which it had won from the Liberals in a by-election.

Redistribution affected seats

Post-election pendulum

See also
Candidates of the 1985 Victorian state election

References

1985 elections in Australia
Elections in Victoria (Australia)
1980s in Victoria (Australia)
March 1985 events in Australia
John Cain